Andrew Callanan (born 30 August 1966) is an Australian former soccer player.

Club career
Callanan played for the Melita Eagles (now Parramatta FC) between 1998 and 1992. He spent time with Blacktown City in 1991.

International career
Callanan made two official appearances for Australia, although also represented them for three other games that were not considered full international matches.

Callanan's only official international caps for Australia were against New Zealand as a part of the Trans-Tasman Cup in 1991. He started both games and helped Australia to victory twice.

References

1966 births
Living people
Australian soccer players
Association football midfielders
Parramatta FC players
Blacktown City FC players
Australia international soccer players